Francisco Mariano Quiñones (1830 – September 13, 1908) was a proponent of the abolition of slavery and of the self-determination of Puerto Rico.

Early years
Quiñones (birth name: Francisco Mariano Quiñones Quiñones) was born into a wealthy family of landowners in San Germán, Puerto Rico, and at a young age developed his lifelong love for literature and journalism.  He was sent to Europe where he attended private schools.  After he finished his secondary education (high school), he went on to university studies in Bremen, Germany, France, and New York.  When Quiñones returned to Puerto Rico in 1848, he went to work for the family business.

Abolitionist
In 1865, the Spanish Crown requested from the municipalities of Puerto Rico recommendations for new laws and Quiñones was elected representative for San Germán. In 1867, Quiñones represented Puerto Rico before the "Overseas Information Committee" meeting in Spain.  Together with Segundo Ruiz Belvis and José Julián Acosta, he demanded the abolition of slavery in Puerto Rico and also protested over the injustices practiced by the governor General Romualdo Palacio González in the island.

Politician
When Quiñones returned to the island, he joined the Puerto Rican Liberal Reformist Party and in 1871 was elected as representative in front of the Spanish Courts. In Spain he continued his fight for the abolition of slavery.

In 1887, Quiñones joined the Autonomist Party headed by Luis Muñoz Rivera. There were some disagreements between Muñoz and some of the members which led to a rupture in the party. Among those who abandoned the party were Quiñones and José Celso Barbosa, who went on to form the Orthodox Autonomist Party.

On February 10, 1898, Spain granted Puerto Rico the rights to self-determination, which was considered the first step towards independence. Quiñones was named President of Puerto Rico's first Cabinet by General Macías.

In 1898, after the Spanish–American War when Puerto Rico became a colonial territory of the United States, Quiñones joined the Puerto Rican Republican Party founded by José Celso Barbosa and which championed the idea of converting Puerto Rico into a state of the U.S. Quiñones was elected and served as a representative in Puerto Rico's House of Representatives in 1900 and 1902. Francisco Mariano Quiñones is buried in the City of San Germán, Puerto Rico.

Works
Among his most important written works of literature are "Artículos (1887) and Apuntes para la Historia de Puerto Rico (1888).

Notes

See also

List of Puerto Ricans

References

External links
  Biography

1830 births
1908 deaths
People from San Germán, Puerto Rico
Puerto Rican abolitionists